Saint-Quentin-au-Bosc is a former commune in the Seine-Maritime department in the Normandy region in northern France. On 1 January 2016, it was merged into the new commune of Petit-Caux.

Geography

Population

Places of interest
 The church of St. Quentin, built in the 19th century.
 The seventeenth century chateau.

See also
Communes of the Seine-Maritime department

References

Former communes of Seine-Maritime